Stephen (I) Lackfi (13051353) was an influential nobleman and a successful military leader in the Kingdom of Hungary. He played a significant role in the Neapolitan campaigns of Louis the Great.

Early life 

Stephen was the eldest son of Lack, or Ladislaus, of the Hermán kindred, who was Count of the Székelys from 1328, and his first unidentified wife. Stephen was born around 1305. He had seven younger brothers, including his strong ally and military co-leader Andrew, Voivode of Transylvania and Denis I, Archbishop of Kalocsa.

According to Simon of Kéza's Gesta Hunnorum et Hungarorum and the 14th-century Illuminated Chronicle, which was written in the 1350s, when Stephen's political career reached its peak and the Lackfis became the most powerful family in the royal court, the Hermán kindred descended from a knight Herman (Hermán), who originated from Nuremberg and settled down in the Kingdom of Hungary after escorting Gisela of Bavaria in 996, who became the wife of Stephen I of Hungary, the future first King of Hungary.

References

Sources 

|-

|-

|-

|-

|-

1300s births
1353 deaths
Medieval Hungarian military leaders
Masters of the treasury (Kingdom of Hungary)
Voivodes of Transylvania
Bans of Croatia
Bans of Slavonia
Stephen 01
14th-century Hungarian people
Masters of the horse (Kingdom of Hungary)